Hellinsia sucrei is a moth of the family Pterophoridae. It is found in Ecuador.

The forewings are pale brown-ochreous and the markings are brown. The hindwings and fringes are pale grey-ochreous.

Etymology
The species is named after Antonio José de Sucre, who was crucial in achieving the freedom of several South American countries.

References

Moths described in 2011
sucrei
Moths of South America